Keteng Baloseng (born 26 February 1967) is a Botswana sprinter. He competed in the men's 4 × 400 metres relay at the 1996 Summer Olympics.

References

External links
 

1967 births
Living people
Athletes (track and field) at the 1996 Summer Olympics
Botswana male sprinters
Olympic athletes of Botswana
Place of birth missing (living people)